Bindman is a surname. Notable people with the surname include:

 Geoffrey Bindman (born 1933), British solicitor specialising in human rights
 David Bindman (born 1940), professor of the history of art, University College London

See also
 Lindman